Uwe Bellmann (born 8 October 1962) is an East German/German cross-country skier who competed from 1982 to 1997. He won a bronze medal in the 4 × 10 km relay at the 1982 FIS Nordic World Ski Championships (Tied with Finland).

Bellman's best individual finish at the World Championships was fifth in the 30 km event at Lahti in 1989. He also competed at the Winter Olympics in 1984 and 1988 where his best finish was fifth in the 15 km event in Calgary.

Bellman won two individual Continental Cup competitions at 15 km in 1993 and 1995.

Cross-country skiing results
All results are sourced from the International Ski Federation (FIS).

Olympic Games

World Championships
 1 medal – (1 bronze)

World Cup

Season standings

Individual podiums

1 podium

Team podiums
1 podium

Note:  Until the 1999 World Championships, World Championship races were included in the World Cup scoring system.

References

External links

German male cross-country skiers
1962 births
Living people
Cross-country skiers at the 1984 Winter Olympics
Cross-country skiers at the 1988 Winter Olympics
FIS Nordic World Ski Championships medalists in cross-country skiing
Olympic cross-country skiers of East Germany
Sportspeople from Freiberg
People from Bezirk Karl-Marx-Stadt